is a railway station in the city of Shimotsuke, Tochigi, Japan, operated by the East Japan Railway Company (JR East).  It is named for Jichi Medical University.

Lines
Through services to and from the Tokaido Line and Yokosuka Line are also provided via the Shonan-Shinjuku Line and Ueno-Tokyo Line.

Station layout
This station has an elevated station building, located above one island platform serving two tracks. The station is staffed.

Platforms

History
Jichi Medical University Station opened on 27 April 1983. With the privatization of JNR on 1 April 1987, the station came under the control of JR East.

Passenger statistics
In fiscal 2019, the station was used by an average of 3520 passengers daily (boarding passengers only).

Surrounding area
Jichi Medical University

References

External links

  JR East station information 

Stations of Japan Freight Railway Company
Railway stations in Tochigi Prefecture
Tōhoku Main Line
Utsunomiya Line
Railway stations in Japan opened in 1983
Shimotsuke, Tochigi
Shōnan-Shinjuku Line
Railway stations at university and college campuses